John Julian Witcombe (born 1 March 1959) is the Dean of Coventry in the Church of England.

Ministry
After ordination in 1984, he served in Birtley, County Durham before moving to be the team Vicar of St Barnabas, Inham Nook, Nottingham. He was then vicar of  St Luke’s, Lodge Moor, Sheffield the Team Rector in Uxbridge and later Dean of St John's College, Nottingham. Before his appointment as Dean of Coventry, Witcombe was the Diocese of Gloucester's Diocesan Directors of Ordinands and then Director of Discipleship and Ministry, and a Residentiary Canon at Gloucester Cathedral. He is a member of General Synod and is a national advisor for selecting potential clergy for the Church of England. He was instituted Dean of Coventry on 19 January 2013.

Works
Editor of The Curate's Guide: From calling to first parish (Church House Publishing 2005) 

Author with John Leach of Grove books 'Hanging on to God: sustaining ministry in the renewal tradition' (Grove Books, 2008)   

Author with John Leach and Mark Tanner of Grove Books 'Renewing the Traditional Church' (Grove Books, 2005)

Personal life
John is married to Ricarda, who is also a priest. They married in 2000 after the death of his first wife Maureen Edwards (another fellow priest). John has one son and two daughters with his first wife Maureen, and two step daughters with his second wife Ricarda.

Styles
 The Reverend John Witcombe (1984–2009)
 The Reverend Canon John Witcombe (2009–2013)
 The Very Reverend John Witcombe (2013–present)

References

Church of England deans
Living people
Provosts and Deans of Coventry
1959 births